Epuraea terminalis is a species of sap-feeding beetles in the family Nitidulidae. It is found in Europe and Northern Asia (excluding China) and North America.

References

 Grouvelle, A. / Schenkling, S., ed. (1913). "Pars 56: Byturidae, Nitidulidae". Coleopterorum Catalogus, 223.
 Majka, Christopher G., and Andrew R. Cline (2006). "Nitidulidae and Kateretidae (Coleoptera: Cucujoidea) of the Maritime provinces of Canada. I. New records from Nova Scotia and Prince Edward Island". The Canadian Entomologist, vol. 138, no. 3, 314–332.
 Parsons, Carl T. (1943). "A revision of Nearctic Nitidulidae (Coleoptera)". Bulletin of the Museum of Comparative Zoology, vol. 92, no. 3, 121–278.
 Price, Michele B., and Daniel K. Young (2006). "An annotated checklist of Wisconsin sap and short-winged flower beetles (Coleoptera: Nitidulidae, Kateretidae)". Insecta Mundi, vol. 20, no. 1-2, 69–84.

Further reading

 Arnett, R. H. Jr., M. C. Thomas, P. E. Skelley and J. H. Frank. (eds.). (21 June 2002). American Beetles, Volume II: Polyphaga: Scarabaeoidea through Curculionoidea. CRC Press LLC, Boca Raton, Florida .
 Arnett, Ross H. (2000). American Insects: A Handbook of the Insects of America North of Mexico. CRC Press.
 Richard E. White. (1983). Peterson Field Guides: Beetles. Houghton Mifflin Company.

External links

 NCBI Taxonomy Browser, Epuraea terminalis

Nitidulidae
Beetles described in 1843